Smoke Boys (formerly Section Boyz and before that Squeeze Section) was a British hip hop collective started by British rapper Ghost in 2010. On 25 September 2015 the group's second mixtape Don't Panic entered at number 36, making their first UK Albums Chart entry. On 4 November 2015, they won Best Newcomer at the MOBO Awards. They were considered to be highly influential in the UK drill scene.

History 
The collective began in 2011 as a loose association of individual rappers from Croydon in South London. First the group called themselves ‘Squeeze 4 P$‘, and then ‘Squeeze Section’. The group released their first mixtape titled Sectionly in 2014 as ‘Section Boyz’. With the second mixtape Don't Panic, the group made it into the “Top 40” of the British Music Charts in 2015 and were subsequently honoured as best newcomers at the MOBO Awards. The group was also chosen to be on the list of the “Sound Of 2016” at the BBC.

In 2016, the group was awarded as the best hip-hop act of the year at the MOBO Awards. This was followed by further mixtapes every year. In 2018 the group changed their name to ‘Smoke Boys’ and released their fifth mixtape Don’t Panic II. The tape brought them into the charts once again. In October 2020 the group released their sixth, and final mixtape titled All The Smoke.

Discography

Mixtapes

EP
 Delete My Number (2016)

Awards and nominations
MOBO Awards Best Newcomer 2015
MOBO Awards Best Hip-Hop 2016

References

Musical groups from London
English hip hop groups
Hip hop collectives
Musical groups established in 2013
British trap musicians
UK drill musicians
2013 establishments in England